is a retired Japanese judoka.

Kase is from Sumida, Tokyo and began judo at Kodokan at the age of a 4th grader. He belonged to Keiyo Gas Co.,Ltd after graduation from Meiji University in 1977.

In 1981, he won a silver medal at the World Championships held in Maastricht. He also participated All-Japan Championships 5 times from 1977 to 1985.

As of 2010, Kase coaches judo at Keiyo Gas.

Achievements 
1976 - Kodokan Cup (-78 kg) 2nd
 - All-Japan University Championships (-78 kg) 1st
1979 - All-Japan Selected Championships (-78 kg) 3rd
 - Kodokan Cup (-60 kg) 2nd
1980 - Pacific Rim Championships (-78 kg) 1st
 - All-Japan Selected Championships (-78 kg) 3rd
 - Kodokan Cup (-60 kg) 3rd
1981 - World Championships (-78 kg) 2nd
 - Pacific Rim Championships (-78 kg) 1st
 - All-Japan Selected Championships (-78 kg) 1st
 - Kodokan Cup (-60 kg) 3rd
1983 - All-Japan Selected Championships (-78 kg) 2nd
 - Kodokan Cup (-60 kg) 2nd
1984 - All-Japan Selected Championships (-78 kg) 3rd
 - Kodokan Cup (-60 kg) 1st

References 

Japanese male judoka
People from Tokyo
1954 births
Living people
20th-century Japanese people
21st-century Japanese people